Harry N. Scheiber (born 1935 in Niagara Falls, Ontario) is an American jurist and legal scholar. He is the Stefan Riesenfeld Professor of Law and History at the University of California, Berkeley School of Law where he is also the director of the Institute for Legal Research. In the latter role, he also directs the Boalt Hall School of Law's Sho Sato Program in Japanese and U.S. Law, and co-directs its Law of the Sea Institute. His work has covered multiple different legal subjects, such as the history of American law, federalism, and environmental law.

Career
Scheiber became an instructor at Dartmouth College in 1960, where he later became a full professor before leaving the faculty in 1971. He then became a professor of American history at UC San Diego, where he taught until joining the faculty of UC Berkeley in 1980. He was named the Stefan Riesenfeld Professor of Law and History there in 1991, and became the director of the Institute for Legal Research (then known as the Earl Warren Legal Institute) in 2002. He was the president of the American Society for Legal History from 2003 to 2005.

Honors and awards
Scheiber received a humanities fellowship from the Rockefeller Foundation in 1979. He was named an honorary life fellow of the American Society for Legal History in 1999, and a fellow of the American Academy of Arts and Sciences in 2004.

References

1935 births
Living people
American legal scholars
American jurists
Dartmouth College faculty
Fellows of the American Academy of Arts and Sciences
Columbia College (New York) alumni
Cornell University alumni
Legal historians
20th-century American historians
American male non-fiction writers
University of California, San Diego faculty
UC Berkeley School of Law faculty
People from Niagara Falls, Ontario
Rockefeller Fellows
Historians from California
Writers from Ontario
20th-century American male writers